Simple  or SIMPLE may refer to:

Simplicity, the state or quality of being simple

Arts and entertainment 
 Simple (album), by Andy Yorke, 2008, and its title track

 "Simple" (Florida Georgia Line song), 2018
 "Simple", a song by Johnny Mathis from the 1984 album A Special Part of Me 
 "Simple", a song by Collective Soul from the 1995 album Collective Soul
 "Simple", a song by Katy Perry from the 2005 soundtrack to The Sisterhood of the Traveling Pants 
 "Simple", a song by Khalil from the 2017 album Prove It All
 "Simple", a song by Kreesha Turner from the 2008 album Passion
 "Simple", a song by Ty Dolla Sign from the 2017 album Beach House 3 deluxe version
 Simple (video game series), budget-priced console games

Businesses and organisations 
 Simple (bank), an American direct bank
 SIMPLE Group, a consulting conglomeration  based in Gibraltar
 Simple Shoes, an American footwear brand
 Simple Skincare, a British brand of soap and skincare products

People
 Simple Kapadia (1958–2009), Indian Bollywood actress and costume designer
 Simple Kaur, Indian weightlifter
 Peter Simple (columnist), pseudonym of Michael Wharton, Daily Telegraph columnist 
 Simple E (Erica Williams), singer-songwriter
 Simple Kid (Ciaran McFeely), Irish-born musical artist
 s1mple (Oleksandr Kostyliev), professional video games player
 List of people known as "the Simple"

Places 
 Simplé, France
 Fort Simple, in Topeka, Kansas, U.S.

Science, and technology and mathematics 
 Simple (abstract algebra), an algebraic structure which cannot be divided
 Simple (botany), a leaf with only a single vein
 SIMPLE (dark matter experiment)
 SIMPLE (instant messaging protocol)
 SIMPLE (military communications protocol), defined by NATO
 Simple (pharmacology), a herbal remedy
 SIMPLE algorithm, in computational fluid dynamics
 Simple machine, a mechanical device that changes the direction or magnitude of a force
 Simple polygon, one whose boundary does not intersect itself
 SiMPLE, a computer programming development system
 SIMPLE, a 4GL environment for the Prime Computer, when running INFORMATION

Other uses 
 Simple (philosophy), a thing that has no proper parts
 Simple aspect or simple tenses, verb forms in English
 SIMPLE IRA or Savings Incentive Match Plan for Employees Individual Retirement Account, a type of employer-provided retirement plan in the United States

See also

 Simples (disambiguation)
 Simpl (disambiguation)
 Simpel
 Semple
 Simplicity (disambiguation)
 Simply (disambiguation)
 Simple Song (disambiguation)